Nombre de Dios   is one of the 39 municipalities of Durango, in north-western Mexico. The municipal seat lies at Nombre de Dios. The municipality covers an area of 1,478.3 km².

As of 2010, the municipality had a total population of 18,488, up from 17,318 as of 2005. 

As of 2010, the town of Nombre de Dios had a population of 5,302. Other than the town of Nombre de Dios, the municipality had 110 localities, the largest of which (with 2010 populations in parentheses) were: San José de la Parrilla (La Parrilla) (1,500), Gabriel Hernández (Mancinas) (1,256), and General Francisco Murguía (1,241), classified as rural.

References 

Municipalities of Durango